Rainy Days is a 1928 Our Gang short silent comedy film directed by Anthony Mack. It was the 71st Our Gang short released.

Cast

The Gang
 Joe Cobb as Joe
 Jackie Condon as Jackie
 Jean Darling as Jean
 Allen Hoskins as Farina
 Bobby Hutchins as Wheezer
 Mildred Kornman as Mildred
 Jay R. Smith as Jay
 Harry Spear as Harry
 Bobby Dean as Other fat kid
 Pete the Pup as himself

Additional cast
 Lyle Tayo as Mom
 Charles A. Bachman as Undetermined role

See also
 Our Gang filmography

References

External links

1928 films
American silent short films
American black-and-white films
1928 comedy films
1928 short films
Films directed by Robert A. McGowan
Metro-Goldwyn-Mayer short films
Our Gang films
1920s American films
Silent American comedy films